Dahaad is a Hindi-language crime, mystery, thriller web series created by Reema Kagti, Zoya Akhtar and directed by Reema Kagti, Ruchika Oberoi, starring Sonakshi Sinha, Gulshan Devaiah, Sohum Shah,Vijay Varma, Yogi Singha, Sanghmitra Hitaishi, Ratnabali Bhattacharjee, Nirmal Chiraniyan, Vijay Kumar Dogra, Abhishek Bhalerao, and Waris Ahmed Zaidi. Dahaad is the first ever Indian web series to premiere at Berlin International film festival, where it will compete for Berlinale Series Award.

Cast 
 Sonakshi Sinha as Anjali Bhaati
 Gulshan Devaiah as Devilal Singh
 Sohum Shah as Kailash Parghi
 Vijay Varma as Anand Swarnakar
 Yogi Singha
 Sanghmitra Hitaishi
 Ratnabali Bhattacharjee
 Nirmal Chiraniyan
 Vijay Kumar Dogra
 Abhishek Bhalerao
 Waris Ahmed Zaidi
 Dev Rajora

Filming 
The shooting of Dahaad was set in a small village of Rajasthan.

Release 
The web series premiered at 73rd Berlin International Film Festival, Germany on February 22, 2023.
 Amazon Prime Video yet not declared release date for India or worldwide.

References

External links
 
 Dahaad at Berlinale

2023 web series debuts
Amazon Prime Video original programming